WBGA (1490 AM) is a radio station broadcasting an urban gospel format. Licensed to Brunswick, Georgia, United States, the station serves the Brunswick area. The station is owned by iHeartMedia, Inc., through licensee iHM Licenses, LLC.

Previous call sign WMOG was said to be an acronym for "Wonderful Marshes of Glynn". The original station was located on the FJ Torras Causeway, overlooking the Glynn County marshes between Brunswick and St. Simons Island.

Former On Air Personalities:  Richard Anderson (1982-1984)

On May 1, 2014, WMOG changed formats from oldies (as "The Beach") to classic hits, rebranded as "Big 96.3".

On May 15, 2014, Qantum Communications announced that it would sell its 29 stations, including WMOG, to Clear Channel Communications (now iHeartMedia), in a transaction connected to Clear Channel's sale of WALK AM-FM in Patchogue, New York to Connoisseur Media via Qantum. The transaction was consummated on September 9, 2014.

On September 8, 2014, WMOG changed formats from oldies to urban adult contemporary, branded as "B96.3 Jamz", under new call letters, WBGA.

On March 14, 2019, WBGA changed formats from urban adult contemporary to urban gospel, branded as "Hallelujah 96.3".

Previous logos

References

External links
Hallelujah 96.3 WBGA Facebook

BGA
IHeartMedia radio stations
Gospel radio stations in the United States
Radio stations established in 1940
1940 establishments in Georgia (U.S. state)
BGA